The Post War Dream may refer to:

 The Post-War Dream (novel), a 2008 novel by American author Mitch Cullin
 "The Post War Dream" (song), a song by Pink Floyd, from the album The Final Cut